Biały mazur (The White Mazurka) is a Polish historical film. It was released in 1979.

Biały mazur is a biographical film about Ludwik Waryński.

Cast 
 Tomasz Grochoczyński as Ludwik Waryński
 Anna Chodakowska as Filipina Płaskowicka
 Aldona Grochal as Aleksandra Jentysówna
 Wojciech Alaborski as Henryk Dulęba
 Mieczysław Grąbka as Stanisław Kunicki
 Grzegorz Warchoł as Stanisław Mendelson
 Grażyna Barszczewska as Maria Jankowska
 Emilian Kamiński as Szymon Dickstein
 Ewa Dałkowska as Wiera Zasulicz
 Jerzy Rogulski as Ignacy Hryniewiecki
 Mieczysław Hryniewicz as Hieronim Truszkowski
 Maciej Góraj as Józef Szmaus
 Tatiana Sosna-Sarno as Anna Sieroszewska
 Franciszek Pieczka as Walery Wróblewski
 Władysław Strzelczyk as Aleksander III Romanow
 Marek Siudym as Uziembło
 Marian Dziędziel as Erazm Kobylański
 Halina Gryglaszewska 
 Stanisław Jaroszyński 
 Jerzy Moes 
 Ryszard Olesiński as Stanisław Waryński
 Jacek Andrucki as Józef Pławiński
 Andrzej Głoskowski

References

External links
 

1979 films
Polish historical films
1970s Polish-language films
1970s historical films